The Battle of Saint-Aubin-du-Cormier may be
Battle of Saint-Aubin-du-Cormier (1488), during the "Mad War"
Battle of Saint-Aubin-du-Cormier (1796), during the Chouannerie